Chiquito Peak, is a summit in the Cuyamaca Mountains of San Diego County, California, United States.

References

Cuyamaca Mountains
Mountains of San Diego County, California
Mountains of Southern California